Wydrzyn may refer to the following places:
Wydrzyn, Łask County in Łódź Voivodeship (central Poland)
Wydrzyn, Wieluń County in Łódź Voivodeship (central Poland)
Wydrzyn, Masovian Voivodeship (east-central Poland)
Wydrzyn, Choszczno County in West Pomeranian Voivodeship (north-west Poland)